Paul Dognin (10 May 1847 – 10 August 1931) was a French entomologist who specialised in the Lepidoptera of South America.
Dognin named 101 new genera of moths.

He was a member of the Royal Belgian Entomological Society and life member of the Société entomologique de France.

Part of his collection was purchased by James John Joicey in 1921.

Publications
Printed by Charles Oberthür 
 Catalogue des Geometridae de l'Amerique Centrale et du Sud.
 Hétérocères nouveaux de l'Amérique du Sud. Fascicule 1. (1910)
 Hétérocères nouveaux de l'Amérique du Sud. Fascicule 3. (1911)
 Hétérocères nouveaux de l'Amérique du Sud. Fascicule 5. (1912)
 Hétérocères nouveaux de l'Amérique du Sud. Fascicule 6. (1912)
 Hétérocères nouveaux de l'Amérique du Sud. Fascicule 7. (1914)
 Hétérocères nouveaux de l'Amérique du Sud. Fascicule 8. (1914)
 Hétérocères nouveaux de l'Amérique du Sud. Fascicule 9. (1916)
 Note sur la faune des Lépidoptères de Loja et environs (Équateur). Description d'espèces nouvelles. (1887–1894). 3 parts 10 plates.

Notes

External links
 "William Schaus Papers" containing material "relating to acquisition of the Paul Dognin Collection of Lepidoptera". Smithsonian Institution Archives. Retrieved December 11, 2017.

Dognin, Paul
1856 births
1931 deaths
19th-century French zoologists
20th-century French zoologists
Scientists from Paris